Gregory Mark Guidry (January 23, 1954 – July 28, 2003) was an American singer-songwriter.

Born in St. Louis, Missouri, United States, he played piano and sang gospel as a child, and sang in a band with future Doobie Brother Michael McDonald as a teenager. With help from Rich Lang, a friend and fellow musician, they wrote and recorded several demos, drove to New York City from St. Louis and signed a publishing contract with CBS Records in 1977 and wrote songs for Climax Blues Band, Robbie Dupree, Exile, Johnnie Taylor, Sawyer Brown, and Reba McEntire. In 1981, he sang as a backing vocalist for the Allman Brothers Band on their 1981 album Brothers of the Road. He signed with Columbia in 1982 and released an album, Over the Line, which produced two hit singles, "Goin' Down" (US No. 17, US AC No. 11) and a duet with his sister Sandy, "Into My Love" (US No. 92).

While he continued to do songwriting work later in the 1980s, he did not issue a follow-up album until 2000, when Soul'd Out and Private Session were released, and his debut album was re-released.

On July 28, 2003, Guidry died in a fire at age 49. His charred body was found in a car parked in his garage in Fairview, Tennessee.

Discography

Albums

Singles

Notable songs written by Guidry
"You're Good for Me" - Single by Exile in 1980 (No. 105 US; No. 44 US AC)
"Gotta Have More Love" - Single by Climax Blues Band in 1980 (No. 47 US; No. 77 AU)
"I Got This Thing for Your Love" - Single by Johnnie Taylor in 1980 (No. 77 US R&B)
"Are You Ready for Love" - Single by Robbie Dupree in 1981
"Ball and Chain" - Canadian single by B4-4 in 2001

References

External links
[ Greg Guidry] at Allmusic.com
Greg Guidry at Bluedesert.dk

1954 births
2003 suicides
American male singer-songwriters
Singer-songwriters from Missouri
Suicides in Tennessee
Musicians from St. Louis
20th-century American singers
20th-century American male singers